Blanca Flores may refer to:

Blanca Flores (handballer),played Handball at the 2011 Pan American Games – Women's tournament
Blanca Flores (OITNB), fictional character